Stefi Celma (born 9 October 1986) is a French actress and singer.

Biography
Stefi Celma was born in Paris to Martinican parents.

When Celma was 4 years old, she took part in the TV show L'École des fans. A few years after, she joined the French Conservatory where she started to learn music, how to play piano, to dance and sing.

In 2005, Celma took part in the musical Sol En Cirque, written by Zazie. Then she joined the team of the live show jukebox musical Je m'voyais déjà, written by Laurent Ruquier,  with Charles Aznavour's songs.

Celma has appeared in different television shows, Le Frère que je n'ai pas eu, Un Flic: Calibre Caraïbe, Trop jeune pour Toi or La Maison des Rocheville.

Celma’s first two film features were Pas très normales Activités directed by Maurice Barthélémy and Les Profs directed by Pierre François Martin Laval. next steps on the big screen were in Les Profs 2 and Antigang.

Celma is best known as Sofia in Dix pour cent (English title: Call My Agent!), produced by France Télévisions.

Filmography

Musical
 2007: Sol en cirque, écrit par Zazie
 2008 : Je m'voyais déjà, Virginie

Theater

Discography
 2006 : Avec les anges (CD single en hommage aux victimes martiniquaises de la catastrophe aérienne du 16 août 2005 au Venezuela)

References

External links

 

1986 births
French female models
French film actresses
French people of Martiniquais descent
French television actresses
French stage actresses
Living people
Actresses from Paris